is a railway station in  Nishi-ku, Nagoya, Aichi Prefecture, Japan, operated by the Tōkai Transport Service Company (TKJ).

Lines

Station layout
The station has one elevated island platform with the station building underneath. The station building has automated ticket machines, TOICA automated turnstiles and is unattended.

Platforms

Adjacent stations

|-
!colspan=5|Tōkai Transport Service Company

Station history
Otai Station was opened on December 1, 1991.

Passenger statistics
In fiscal 2017, the station was used by an average of 177 passengers daily

Surrounding area
Kami-Otai Station
Yamada Elementary School
Yamada Junior High School

See also
 List of Railway Stations in Japan

References

External links

Railway stations in Japan opened in 1991
Railway stations in Nagoya